Martim Longo is a Portuguese freguesia ("civil parish") in the municipality (concelho) of Alcoutim, on the eastern side of the Algarve. The population in 2011 was 1,030, in an area of 128.45 km².

Heritage Sites
Cerro do Castelo de Santa Justa Bronze Era settlement
Igreja de Martim Longo

References

Villages in the Algarve
Freguesias of Alcoutim